Lauren Duca (born February 24, 1991) is an American freelance journalist, feminist, and political columnist. She formerly worked at Teen Vogue, where she had a column from 2017 to 2018 called "Thigh High Politics". Her book How to Start a Revolution (2019) is on young people and the future of American politics.

Early life and education 
Duca was born in New York City and grew up in an affluent New Jersey suburb. Her parents live in New Jersey, and she has a younger brother.

In 2013, Duca graduated from Fordham University with a bachelor's degree in English and philosophy. During this time, she was editor in chief of the alternative newspaper, the paper. In 2015, Duca received her master's degree in journalism and critical theory from New York University.

Career 
In 2013, Duca got her start working as an online editorial intern for New York Magazine. From 2013 to 2015, Duca worked as a reporter at The Huffington Post. In 2015, she began working as a freelance reporter, often writing for Teen Vogue.

In December 2016, Duca drew attention for an op-ed in Teen Vogue titled "Donald Trump is Gaslighting America," which argued that then President-elect Donald Trump relied on deceit to undermine the truth so his critics would question their own judgment. As of December 23, 2016, the essay had been viewed 1.2 million times, becoming the magazine's most-viewed post. Katie Mettler of The Washington Post said, "[T]he Internet lit up with praise for [Duca's] 'scorched-earth' op-ed." The essay was widely cited as a turning point in the fashion magazine's reputation, with a newly recognized political dimension.

Duca appeared on Tucker Carlson Tonight on December 23, 2016, and in the heated exchange over her commentary on Ivanka Trump, Duca criticized host Tucker Carlson for not allowing her to speak and called Carlson a "partisan hack." In response, he told her that instead of political commentary, she "should stick to the thigh-high boots," referring to her earlier articles on pop star Ariana Grande. Online harassment of Duca followed, including threats of sexual assault.

In response, Duca named her new column at Teen Vogue, begun in February 2017, "Thigh-High Politics." According to the magazine, "Thigh High Politics" "[broke] down the news, provides resources for the resistance, and just generally refuses to accept toxic nonsense." She also designed a t-shirt in July 2017 with the phrase "I like my politics thigh-high," and donated all of the proceeds from each $32 shirt to Planned Parenthood in Carlson's name. As of December 2017, over $10,000 were raised. In the face of backlash against Teen Vogue, Duca has defended the political commentary featured on the website, citing the disconnect between critics who find young women's interests as too silly for intellectual conversation and the reprimand young women face for not participating in political process.

In 2017, former pharmaceutical executive Martin Shkreli attempted to contact Duca a number of times and referenced her routinely in social media. In early January 2017, Shkreli direct-messaged Duca, tweeted her directly, edited a collage of Duca for his Twitter banner, and superimposed his face on top of an image of Duca and her then-husband to use as his profile photo. Duca made her discomfort in Shkreli's advances known on her Twitter, posting a screenshot of a direct message from Shkreli inviting her to Donald Trump's inauguration with the caption, “I would rather eat my own organs.” Duca also posted screenshots of Shkreli's Twitter profile using her appearance, asking the platform's founder and CEO Jack Dorsey how Shkreli's actions were allowed. Shkreli's Twitter account was then suspended for violating the website's rules prohibiting targeted harassment. On July 28, 2017, Duca released a Twitter statement on her thoughts regarding Shkreli's securities-fraud trial and his sexual comments on a Facebook livestream. Duca tweeted, "I would (still) rather eat my own organs. So much as touch me, and I'll gladly chop off one of yours."

On 21 February 2018, Duca responded to Billy Graham's death by tweeting: "The big news today is that Billy Graham was still alive this whole time. Anyway, have fun in hell, bitch." Her post drew some backlash on the internet. In response to Fox News' coverage of her tweet, Duca noted: "The Fox article and segment on my stupid tweet are really miraculous in their bad-faith consternation. Billy Graham called being gay 'a sinister form of perversion,' and floated the idea that 'AIDS is a punishment from God.' If hell is real, that's exactly where he's headed."

In May 2018, it was announced that Duca would be a visiting scholar at New York University's journalism department. In the summer of 2019, Duca taught a six-week course there entitled "The Feminist Journalist." The class was taught under the NYU Arthur L. Carter Journalism Institute and focused on intersections of feminist ideology and the practice of journalism, and was made up of high-school and college students. Four weeks after the course, students sent a collective formal complaint to school's journalism department regarding Duca's conduct during the class, writing, "We are disappointed at the department and NYU for hiring a professor with more interest in promoting her book than teaching a group of students eager to learn." Students allege that Duca targeted an exchange student, writing that she "consistently targeted this student on the basis of a communication difficulty the student cannot change.

In September 2019, Duca released her first book, which was called How to Start a Revolution: Young People and the Future of American Politics.

In September 2020, Duca announced her indefinite hiatus from journalism.

Personal life 
Duca lives in Brooklyn with her pet Shiba Inu, Demi. Duca was married to Kris Fleming , but announced on Twitter on January 13, 2019, that she was getting divorced from her husband. Since her divorce, Duca has identified as queer, and announced her second marriage on September 5, 2020.

Honors 
 2015: Los Angeles Press Club, National Arts and Entertainment Journalism Award, Online – Film/TV/Theater Feature for "The Rise of the Woman-Child"
 2017: Citizens' Committee for Children, Vanguard Award
2017: Shorty Awards, Best in Journalism

Selected works and publications

References

External links

 Lauren Duca at Teen Vogue
 
 Lauren Duca at The Huffington Post
 

1991 births
Living people
21st-century American non-fiction writers
21st-century American women writers
American magazine editors
Fordham University alumni
New York University alumni
American feminist writers
LGBT people from New York (state)
Queer writers
American women non-fiction writers
Women magazine editors
Writers from New York City
Feminist artists
American LGBT writers
American LGBT journalists